Ulsky is a rural locality (a settlement) in Zarevskoye Rural Settlement of Shovgenovsky District, the Republic of Adygea, Russia. The population was 123 as of 2018. There are 3 streets.

Geography 
Ulsky is located 19 km west of Khakurinokhabl (the district's administrative centre) by road. Zarevo is the nearest rural locality.

References 

Rural localities in Shovgenovsky District